Diya Yata Gindara (Fire within Water) is a 2004 Sri Lankan Sinhala drama film directed by Udayakantha Warnasuriya and produced by Cinema Entertainment private limited. It stars Achala Alles and Sanath Gunathilake in lead roles along with Amarasiri Kalansuriya and Tony Ranasinghe. Music composed by Sangeeth Wickramasinghe. It is the 1027th Sri Lankan film in the Sinhala cinema.

During the shooting of the film, a Skoda car in running condition valued over Rs. 100,000 was set aflame. Shooting was completed within two months in and around Colombo city, Piliyandala, Kirindiwela and Nuwara Eliya. The film marks the return of veteran actor Amarasiri Kalansuriya to the silver screen after an absence of seventeen years.

Plot

Cast
 Sanath Gunathilake as Sampath Harischandra
 Achala Alles as Madara Harischandra
 Amarasiri Kalansuriya as Jayakody
 Srimal Wedisinghe as Inspector Jayasumana Bandara
 Jeevan Handunnetti as Rohana
 Buddhika Rambukwella as Grecian
 Srinath Maddumage as Herath
 Janesh Silva as Nizam
 Tyrone Michael as Detective
 Tony Ranasinghe as Police Chief
 Nirosha Herath as Madara's sister
 Seetha Kumari as Sampath's mother
 Gunawardena Hettiarachchi as Burned Car Inspector
 Ariyasena Gamage as Burned car discoverer
 D.B. Gangodathenna as Communication store owner

References

2004 films
2000s Sinhala-language films
Films directed by Udayakantha Warnasuriya